Goodbye (translit. Be omid e didār) is a 2011 Iranian drama film. It offers an incisive portrait of an Iranian citizen straining under curtailed personal freedoms.

Cast
 Leila Zare
 Roya Teymourian
 Hasan Pourshirazi
 Behnam Tashakkor
 Fereshteh Sadreorafai
 Shahab Hosseini

Plot
Noura (Leyla Zareh) is an attorney whose license has been revoked by the government, as her resultant attempts at escape meet with ever-mounting roadblocks. Evoking a sense of dread and despair, Rasoulof (himself officially constrained from making more films) constructs a fitting metaphor for the stultifying pressures faced by many in today's Iran.

Awards
Winner of best director honors in the Un Certain Regard section of the 2011 Cannes Film Festival.

References

External links
 

Iranian drama films
2011 films
2010s Persian-language films